Viraval (also known as Viraval Village) is a part of Navsari Nagarpalika located in south Gujarat, India.

Viraval village is located in Navsari Tehsil of Navsari district in Gujarat, India. As per 2009 stats, Viraval village is also a gram panchayat.

Viraval has a total population of around 9,000 people. There are about 1,375 houses in Viraval village.

Shree Ram temple, Jaldevi ma temple and BOB bank are also located in Viraval.

External links
 Kadiawas - additional information regarding Viraval

Villages in Navsari district